Kuşcuören, Kızılcahamam is a village in the District of Kızılcahamam, Ankara Province, Turkey.

Notable natives
 Emrullah İşler (born 1960), academic for theology and Deputy Prime Minister (2013- )

References

Villages in Kızılcahamam District